The 1983 Biga earthquake hit northwestern Turkey on 5 July 1983. Responsible for five deaths and approximately twenty-six casualties throughout Biga and Erdek and damage in Istanbul, the earthquake measured 6.1 on the surface wave magnitude scale. It shook places as far away as eastern Greece. The United States Geological Survey listed the earthquake among the "Significant Earthquakes of the World" for 1983.

Geology 
The Biga Peninsula is an area marked by active faults including strike-slip movement and en echelon divergent basins.

The earthquake was preceded by a foreshock nearly a year prior, and was followed by aftershock clusters.

References

Further reading

External links 

1983 earthquakes
1983 Biga
Geology of Turkey
1983 in Turkey
History of Çanakkale Province
July 1983 events in Europe
1983 disasters in Turkey